Robert William Blair (born 23 June 1932) is a former cricketer who played 19 Test matches for New Zealand.

Cricket career
Blair was a fast bowler who was never quite able to carry his enormous success for Wellington in the Plunket Shield over into the Test arena. In 59 matches for Wellington from 1951–52 to 1964–65 he took 330 wickets at an average of 15.16. In his best season, he took 46 wickets in the five matches of 1956–57 at an average of 9.47, twice taking nine wickets in an innings. The next season, he took 34 at 11.20, then in a trial match at the end of the season he took five wickets in each innings for North Island against South Island. But in the series that followed a few months later in England, he took only three wickets in three Tests, at an average of 70. He achieved his best Test match figures, 7 for 142, in what turned out to be his last Test, against South Africa at Auckland in 1963–64.

Blair holds the record for the lowest career batting average by a Test player who scored a 50 in an innings, with 6.75. His one 50 came in the first innings of the Second Test against England at Wellington in 1962–63, when he came to the wicket with the score at 96 for 7 and hit 64 not out, the top score of the innings, putting on 44 for the last wicket with Frank Cameron to take the final total to 194.

In the mid-1980s Blair joined Widnes Cricket Club, who were then part of the Manchester and District Cricket Association, as a coach. In the late 1990s Blair was coach of the Zimbabwe domestic first class team Matabeleland that competed for the Logan Cup. He then returned for a second spell with Widnes, who had by that time joined the Cheshire County Cricket League. He now lives in Warrington, Cheshire.

Blair and the Tangiwai disaster
In December 1953 Blair, playing for New Zealand against South Africa at Johannesburg, received news that his fiancée, Nerissa Love, had been killed in the Tangiwai railway disaster on Christmas Eve. Blair was not expected to bat when his turn came on Boxing Day, as an announcement had been made that he would take no further part in the game. In the event, however, he appeared at the crease at the fall of the ninth wicket to join Bert Sutcliffe, who had already started to walk off the field. The packed crowd stood in silence. The two men added 33 for the last wicket, with Sutcliffe striking three sixes and Blair one from a single eight-ball over, but in the next over Blair was stumped off Hugh Tayfield. South Africa won the match by 132 runs. 

A book about the incident, What Are You Doing Out Here: Heroism and Distress at a Cricket Test by Norman Harris, was published in 2010. Blair wrote the foreword.

In 2011 a television film about the disaster, Tangiwai: A Love Story, was made by Lippy Pictures for Television New Zealand, focusing on the love story of Bob Blair and his fiancée Nerissa Love. Blair was portrayed by actor Ryan O'Kane and Nerissa Love by Rose McIver. It premiered on TV One on 14 August 2011. It has since been released on DVD.

A play written and performed by Auckland actor Jonny Brugh, The Second Test, tells the story from Blair's perspective, emphasizing his commitment to continue playing with the New Zealand team.

In 1986, 33 years after the Tangiwai disaster, Blair married his wife Barbara. The couple reside in England.

References

External links
 

1932 births
Living people
Central Districts cricketers
New Zealand Test cricketers
Wellington cricketers
North Island cricketers